Exeretonevra is a genus of flies in the family Xylophagidae.

Species
Exeretonevra angustifrons Hardy, 1924
Exeretonevra maculipennis Macquart, 1846
Exeretonevra tertia Paramonov, 1953
Exeretonevra zentae Paramonov, 1953

References

Xylophagidae
Brachycera genera
Taxa named by Pierre-Justin-Marie Macquart
Diptera of Australasia